The Polson Iron Works was an Ontario-based firm which built large steam engines, as well as ships, barges and dredges.

Founded by William Polson (1834–1901) and son Franklin Bates Polson, the firm was incorporated in 1886 and it was one of the original shipyards operating in Toronto.

In 1888 favourable land grants prompted the company to move to Owen Sound, which was then an important port for Canadian Pacific's steamships.

The firm eventually returned to Toronto in 1897 when Owen Sound's town council did not renew the firm's exemption from property taxes. In Toronto the company's ship yard was located on the harbourfront at the foot of Sherbourne Street. In 1914 the company agreed to lease land from the Toronto Harbour Commission to build a new facility in the newly reclaimed Portlands industrial district, but the outbreak of World War I prevented the move.

Some of the vessels constructed by the Polson Iron Works remain in service today.

The engines and hull of Bonnington, a steamboat that ran on the Arrow Lakes from 1911 to 1931, were built at the Polson Iron Works, and shipped by rail to British Columbia.

The company ceased operations around 1919, but the name lives on in Polson Pier, where the company had intended to relocate the shipyard.

Ships built
Polson was a builder of motor yachts for the wealthy in Toronto during the late 19th and early 20th centuries.

List of ships built:

Motor yachts

 Mockingbird (1886)
 Vivid (1886)
 Rescue (1886)
 Electric (1887)
 Gypsy (1887)
 Siesta (1889)
 Undine (1889)
 Naiad (1890)
 Siesta (1892)
 Undine (1892)
 Mizpah (1892)
 Annie C. Hill (1898)
 Wanda (1898)
 Bobs (1900)
 Llaus (1900)
 Islander (1900)
 Llano (1900)
 Ina (1901)
 Kate (1902)
 Espanola (1902)
 Linnea (1903)
 Mildred (1903)
 Rambler (1903)
 Temagami (1905)
 Wanda II (1905)
 Wawinet (1904)
 Keego (1909)
 Sir Wilfrid (1902)
 Morning Star (1907)
 Roberval (1907)
 Bessie Butler (1907)
 P.W.D. No. 117 (1909)
 Kwasind (1912)
 Wanda III (1915)

Tugs
 Conqueror (1886)
 Pikouagami (1906)
 Loretta (1908)
 G.R. Geary (1912)
 Batchawanna (1912)

Ferries
 City of Chatham (1888)
 Mizpah (1889)
 Majestic (1899)
 Algoma (1901)
 Charles Lyon (1908)
 Kuskanook

Passenger vessels
 Manitoba (1889)

Train ferries
 Ontario (1890, for CPR)
 Ontario #2 (1915)

Patrol boats
  (1891)
  (1892)
  (1892)
  (1903)

Others

 Knapp roller boat (1897)
 Barge Inenew (1902)
 Lightship Lurcher (1903)
 Lightship Anticosti (1904)
 Hercules (1906)
 Barge Navarch (1906)
 Keego (1909)
 Clinker Shuniah (1910)
 Fireboat  (1911)
 Drill Scow MNCO No 6 (1912)
 Clinker Port Nelson (1913)
 Dredge City Dredge No 2 (1914)
 Cyclone (1914)
 Buoy tender Grenville (1914)
 Terminals Lighter Hudson Bay No. 1 (1914)
 Terminals Lighter Hudson Bay No. 2 (1914)
 Terminals Lighter Hudson Bay No. 3 (1914)
 Q.H.C. No 51 (1914)
 Q.H.C. No 52 (1914)
 Q.H.C. No 53 (1914)
 Q.H.C. No 54 (1914)
 Q.H.C. No 55 (1914)
 Seventy Five (1915)
 Tornado (1915)

Naval vessels
  (1917) minesweeper
  (1917) minesweeper
  (1917) minesweeper
  (1917) minesweeper
  (1917) minesweeper
  (1917) minesweeper

Cargo vessels
 Tento (1918)
 Asp (1918)
 War Hydra (1919)
 War Taurus (1919)
 War Tamiskaming (1919)
 Aquila / War Hamilton (1919)
 War Algoma (1919)
 War Halton (1919)

Aircraft

In 1916 Polson Iron Works was involved in the production of the M.F.P Tractor Biplane for MFP Company owned by J.B. Miller, Walter L. Fairchild and Walter H. Phipps. The plane was designed by Walter H. Phipps, owner of Steel Constructed Aeroplanes Co of New York. Fairchild was a monoplane pioneer from Hempstead Plains, New York.

References

1886 establishments in Ontario
1919 disestablishments
Manufacturing companies based in Toronto
Owen Sound
Shipbuilding companies of Canada
History of manufacturing in Ontario
Canadian companies established in 1886